Miguel Ángel Barbieri (born 24 August 1993) is an Argentine professional footballer who plays as a centre-back for Liga MX club Querétaro.

Club career
Argentinos Juniors were Barbieri's first team in his youth career, prior to joining Defensores de Belgrano's system. He was promoted into the club's first-team during the 2011–12 Primera B Metropolitana, making three appearances as Defensores de Belgrano finished 18th. In the following four seasons, Barbieri made seventy-five appearances with the final campaign, 2015, yielding five goals in forty-one games. In January 2016, Argentine Primera División side Racing Club loaned Barbieri for eighteen months. Two goals in thirteen games followed, which led to Racing signing him permanently in July 2017.

On 15 July 2018, Barbieri joined Rosario Central on loan. He remained until December 2019, making twenty-five appearances whilst with the club; also scoring one goal, versus Aldosivi in the Copa de la Superliga on 20 April 2019. January 2020 saw Barbieri head abroad for the first time, as he agreed terms with Liga MX club Tijuana; amid interest of a renewal from Rosario. He made his debut on 10 January in a win over Santos Laguna, having replaced Mauro Lainez with six minutes remaining. In total, the centre-back appeared twenty-four times and netted one goal; on 10 March in the Copa MX against Toluca.

Barbieri would later sign for Toluca, after putting pen to paper on a contract in December 2020; with it commencing in the succeeding January.

International career
Barbieri represented the Argentina U23s at the 2016 Sait Nagjee Trophy in India. He featured in matches against 1860 Munich II and Shamrock Rovers (as captain) as Argentina were eliminated at the group stage.

Career statistics
.

Honours
Rosario Central
 Copa Argentina: 2017–18

References

External links

1993 births
Living people
Footballers from Buenos Aires
Argentine footballers
Argentina youth international footballers
Association football defenders
Argentine expatriate footballers
Expatriate footballers in Mexico
Argentine expatriate sportspeople in Mexico
Primera B Metropolitana players
Primera C Metropolitana players
Argentine Primera División players
Liga MX players
Defensores de Belgrano footballers
Racing Club de Avellaneda footballers
Rosario Central footballers
Club Tijuana footballers
Deportivo Toluca F.C. players